Waterhen 130 is an Indian reserve of the Waterhen Lake First Nation in Saskatchewan. It is 39 kilometers north of Meadow Lake. In the 2016 Canadian Census, it recorded a population of 672 living in 196 of its 213 total private dwellings. In the same year, its Community Well-Being index was calculated at 51 of 100, compared to 58.4 for the average First Nations community and 77.5 for the average non-Indigenous community.

References

Indian reserves in Saskatchewan
Division No. 17, Saskatchewan